Lisa Lambert (born December 1962 in Washington D.C.) is an actress, comedy writer, and Tony Award-winning composer, best known for writing the music and lyrics to The Drowsy Chaperone.

Career
Lambert played in the movies Childstar and Slings and Arrows. Her works for television include Getting Along Famously and Skippy's Rangers- The Show They Never Gave.

Lambert also took part in stage productions, including Mirth, People Park, The Irish Musical, The Drowsy Chaperone, The Bargain Musical, All Hams on Deck, Ouch My Toe, An American in Harris, An Awkward Evening with Martin and Johnson.

Awards
Lambert won the Tony Award for Best Original Score, the Drama Desk Award for Outstanding Music, and the Drama Desk Award for Outstanding Lyrics for The Drowsy Chaperone.

References

External links 

1962 births
Living people
Tony Award winners
Drama Desk Award winners
Jewish Canadian actresses
Jewish composers
Canadian film actresses
Canadian television actresses
Canadian stage actresses
Canadian Comedy Award winners